The 2019 Nigerian House of Representatives elections in Nasarawa State was held on February 23, 2019, to elect members of the House of Representatives to represent Nasarawa State, Nigeria.

Overview

Summary

Results

Nasarawa/Toto 
A total of 11 candidates registered with the Independent National Electoral Commission to contest in the election. APC candidate Ari Muhammed Abdulmumin won the election, defeating PDP Musa Ahmed Mohammed and 9 other party candidates.

Lafia/Obi 
A total of 13 candidates registered with the Independent National Electoral Commission to contest in the election. APC candidate Abubakar Sarki Dahiru won the election, defeating PDP Joseph Haruna Kigbu and 11 other party candidates.

Keffi/Karu/Kokona 
A total of 12 candidates registered with the Independent National Electoral Commission to contest in the election. PDP candidate Gaza Jonathan Gbefwi won the election, defeating APC Jacob Okari Owa and 10 other party candidates.

Awe/Doma/Keana 
A total of 8 candidates registered with the Independent National Electoral Commission to contest in the election. APC candidate Hassan Abubakar Nalaraba won the election, defeating PDP Abubakar Idris Gani and 6 other party candidates.

Akwanga/Nasarawa/Eggon/Wamba 
A total of 16 candidates registered with the Independent National Electoral Commission to contest in the election. PDP candidate Abdulkarim Usman won the election, defeating APC Muhammed Abdullahi Yau and 14 other party candidates.

References 

Nasarawa State House of Representatives elections
House of Representatives
Nasarawa